This is an incomplete list of works written by the Austrian composer Eduard Strauss (1835–1916), son of Johann Strauss I and the younger brother of Johann Strauss II.

Waltzes, Polkas and Marches

See also
 The Strauss Family - TV Drama

References
Eduard Strauss (1835-1916) list of works at Classical Archives.

External links
 Complete Recordings of 200+ Eduard Strauss' Rarities in 20+ CDs performed in a most authentic fashion
 List of works by Eduard Strauss at the International Music Score Library Project
 Eduard Strauss on the Johann Strauss Society of Great Britain
 A complete list of Eduard Strauss' compositions

 
Strauss, Eduard